Freshfield is an English surname, notably of the family that founded the law firm Freshfields. The name is not derived from Freshfield, a suburb of Formby, Merseyside, which was named in the mid-nineteenth century. People with the surname Freshfield include:

Charles Freshfield (1808–1891), British lawyer and Member of Parliament
Douglas Freshfield (1845–1934), British lawyer, mountaineer and author, son of Henry Ray and Jane
Henry Ray Freshfield (1814–1895), British lawyer and conservationist, husband of Jane, father of Douglas
James William Freshfield (1774–1864), British lawyer and Member of Parliament
Jane Freshfield (1814–1901), English climber and travel writer, wife of Henry Ray, mother of Douglas